A statue of Ma Zhanshan is installed in Shanghai's New Town Central Park, in China.

External links
 

Changning District
Monuments and memorials in China
Outdoor sculptures in Shanghai
Sculptures of men in China
Statues in China